Tehaʻapapa I (c. 1735–1790) (Tehaʻapapa Fatu'araʻi Teri'i-tariʻa Te-i'oa-tua-vahine) was a Queen regnant of the island of Huahine. She was the ruler of that island during the time Captain Cook visited the island and an ancestor of Queen Teha'apapa II.

Biography
She was born in 1735 and became queen in 1760. Her husbands were Chiefs Rohianuʻu and Mato Teriʻi-te Po Areʻi of Raiatea (both brothers). 

She died in 1790 and her successor was her son Teriʻitaria I. His father was Mato.

She had a daughter Tura'iari'i Ehevahine, who was a queen consort of Raiatea. Her grandchildren were king Tamatoa IV and queen Teri'itaria II.

Family

See also
Kingdom of Huahine
List of monarchs of Huahine

References

Huahine royalty
Oceanian monarchs
1735 births
1790 deaths
Queens regnant in Oceania
18th-century women rulers